Shamsul Alam is a Bangladeshi cricketer. He made his List A debut for Abahani Limited in the 2013–14 Dhaka Premier Division Cricket League on 30 September 2013. On 7 November 2013, in the match against Brothers Union, he took a five-wicket haul and was named the player of the match.

References

External links
 

Year of birth missing (living people)
Living people
Bangladeshi cricketers
Abahani Limited cricketers
Khelaghar Samaj Kallyan Samity cricketers
Place of birth missing (living people)